Wernya griseochrysa is a moth in the family Drepanidae. It was described by Gyula M. László, Gábor Ronkay and László Aladár Ronkay in 2001. It is found in Vietnam and Hainan, China.

Subspecies
Wernya griseochrysa griseochrysa (Vietnam)
Wernya griseochrysa hainanensis Xue, Yang & Han, 2012 (China: Hainan)

References

Moths described in 2001
Thyatirinae
Moths of Asia